Oluseun Anikulapo Kuti (born 11 January 1983), who is called by the name Seun Kuti, is a Nigerian musician, singer and the youngest son of the famous Afrobeat pioneer, Fela Kuti. Seun leads his father's former band Egypt 80.

Biography

The youngest son of Fela Kuti, Kuti was born in 1983. He became interested in music at the age of five, by the time he turned nine, he had started playing with his father's band, Egypt 80.

Fela Kuti died in 1997 and Seun Kuti took to the role of leading Egypt 80.

In 2008, the band released an album called Many Things. This was the first album released under the moniker Sean Kuti & Egypt 80.

He is featured in Calle 13's song "Todo se mueve" (Everything Moves), on their 2010 album Entren los que quieran.

In 2014, Seun Kuti was given an honorary invitation to perform live for the first time at the Industry Nite.

In 2019, Kuti was a featured guest on 85 to Africa; the second album by American rapper Jidenna. In June, Kuti was featured in the Visual Collaborative electronic catalogue, under the Polaris series, he was interviewed on Pan-African awareness, his country and music.

Politics
Kuti participated actively in the Occupy Nigeria protests against the fuel subsidy removal policy of President Goodluck Jonathan in his country Nigeria in January 2012. Seun Kuti is an atheist.

In 2019, on Jidenna's 85 to Africa album Kuti voiced an outro of a song with the words:

"I believe it's time for an African peoples powered highway. A highway that will connect the Diaspora and Motherland. A global highway for African people all over the world to rediscover themselves. To remember that the only thing that unites black people, globally, the only thing we all have in common is that we are from Africa".

In November 2020, he led the revival of his father's defunct political party - Movement of the People - with the intention of registering it with Nigeria's electoral body, INEC.

Personal life
Seun welcomed a baby girl with his partner on 16 December 2013 and named her Ifafunmike Adara Anikulapo-Kuti.

Reception 
In 2018, Black Times, by Seun Kuti was nominated for the Grammys, in the World Music Category. This makes him the second child of the late Fela Anikulapo Kuti to be considered for this award, as his elder brother Femi Kuti has been previously nominated in the same category without a win.

Discography
Released as Sean Kuti & Egypt 80:

Studio albums 
Many Things (CD & LP album, 2008, Tôt ou Tard, Disorient Records)
From Africa With Fury: Rise (2011, Knitting Factory Records/Because Music)
A Long Way To the Beginning (2014, Knitting Factory Records)
Struggle Sounds (EP, 2016, Sony Masterworks)
Black Times (CD & LP album, 2018, Strut Records)
Night Dreamer Direct to Disc Sessions (CD & LP, 2019, Night Dreamer Records)

 Other recordings Think Africa (12", 2007)African Dreams EP (2022, with Black Thought)

 Appearances 
"James Brown" (on the album I'm Not Bossy, I'm the Boss'' by Sinéad O'Connor) (2014, Nettwerk)

See also
Ransome-Kuti family
Femi Kuti

References

External links
 Seun Kuti / Seun Kuti & Egypt 80 discographies at Discogs
 Seun Kuti on Myspace
 Sean Kuti Interview on Monocle 24 with Georgina Godwin
 Seun Kuti Seun Kuti First Nomination at Grammy Awards for Best World Music Album

Living people
Nigerian male musicians
Nigerian saxophonists
1983 births
World music musicians
Ransome-Kuti family
Nigerian atheists
Yoruba musicians
21st-century Nigerian musicians
Musicians from Lagos
21st-century saxophonists
Because Music artists
Knitting Factory Records artists